The Legislative Assembly of Tver Oblast is the regional parliament of Tver Oblast, a federal subject of Russia. A total of 40 deputies are elected for five-year terms.

History 
On 20 March 1994, the first Legislative Assembly, consisting of 32 deputies, was elected by direct popular vote. The first meeting was held on 31 March. The deputies adopted the Declaration, which proclaimed: "The Legislative Assembly exercises representative (legislative) power in Tver Oblast and is part of the system of state authorities."

On 14 December 1997, elections of the second Legislative Assembly took place in all 26 constituencies. 33 deputies were elected, of which seven were members of the first Assembly. On 29 November 1998, the Charter of Tver Oblast was adopted.

Composition

2016

2021

Chairmen 
Vladimir Kurbatov — 1st convocation — 1994–97
Vyacheslav Mironov — 2nd convocation — 1997–2001
Mark Hasainov — 3rd convocation — 2001–05
Andrey Yepishin — 4th, 5th convocations — 2005–16
Sergey Golubev — 6th, 7th convocations — from 2016

References 

Tver Oblast
Politics of Tver Oblast